The 1979–80 Kent Football League season was the 14th in the history of the Kent Football League, a football competition in England.
 
The league was won by Chatham Town, but the club was not promoted to the Southern Football League.

League table

The league featured 17 clubs which competed in the previous season, no new clubs joined the league this season.

Medway changed name back to Chatham Town.

League table

References

External links

1979-80
1979–80 in English football leagues